CTAE may refer to:
Commonwealth Trans-Antarctic Expedition
College of Technology & Engineering, Udaipur in Udaipur
Community Technical and Adult Education, a vocational-technical student organization
Centre de Technologia Aerospacial, an Aerospace Research and Technology Centre based in Barcelona, Spain.